Jack Lukeman (born Seán Loughman 11 February 1973), usually simply known as Jack L, is an Irish songwriter, musician, record producer, vocal artist and broadcaster.

History
A native of Athy Co. Kildare Ireland, Jack Lukeman attended a youth club in Athy known as Aontas Ogra at the age of 12 years old, where he was involved in artistic ventures as well as playing music there. He left school at 15. After spending a short period in the family business he began playing music full-time at 18 cutting his teeth on the Bohemian busking scene around Europe in the early 90s. Playing across Holland, Belgium and Germany sometimes playing with art rock band Serious Women with David Constantine and Martin Clancy whom he has continued to collaborate with over the years. His first vocal performance can be heard on Serious Women's album 38SCR, called after the art-house in which they all lived and where the album was made. Lukeman first came to prominence in the summer of 1995 when he and The Black Romantics took up a residency at The Da Club (Dublin Arts Club) in Dublin selling out night after night. The band's set included interpretations of the famous Belgian bard Jacques Brel along with several of Jack's own compositions. The band recorded the album Wax in 1995 before splitting in 1997.

Lukeman established himself as a solo artist and songwriter with his memorable live shows and his breakthrough 1999 Multi-Platinum selling album Metropolis Blue, gaining record deals and touring extensively in the US and Europe becoming a regular fixture on U.S college radio with the singles Rooftop Lullabye, Georgie Boy and  Ode to Ed Wood

John Walshe of Hot Press magazine states "Lukeman's voice is powerful and fluid. His range too is impressive, from the deep baritone resonance of 'When The Moon Is High' to the aching falsetto of the magnificent 'Rooftop Lullaby' ... this is a timeless collection of fine songs, beautifully delivered, from an artist as unique as Ireland has ever produced".  He released three singles from this album: Georgie Boy, Ode to Ed Wood and Rooftop Lullaby.

Metropolis Blue was followed up with 2001's critically lauded and groundbreaking album Universe. The album was recorded in L.A, Jamaica and Dublin with Multi-Grammy record producer Greg Wells of Adele and OneRepublic fame producing the single So Far Gone. It becoming one of the biggest radio hits of the year with the album also producing the singles Don't Fall in Love and Little Man.

The album was supported in 2002 with a run of special theatre shows with theatre director Raymond Keane from Barabus. It was called The Little Universe and combined black box and light theatre with music and earned five star reviews in The Guardian.

2003 saw Lukeman play a 14-week residency of shows in Spirit in Dublin producing the DVD Chez Jack L.

2005 saw the release of studio album written and produced by Lukeman, Broken Songs, which gave birth to the warmly received radio hit single Open Your Borders, You Can't Get Bitter,  Chocolate Eyes and Authentic Fake. Lukeman followed up the success of Broken Songs in 2006 with a live DVD MOMENTO performing to a packed Olympia Theatre crowd.

In 2008, Lukeman released Burn On, an album of Randy Newman classics receiving a seal of approval by Newman himself, which boasted a performance with the Brooklyn Philharmonic Orchestra in NYC's South Street Seaport.

In 2010 Jack Lukeman broke new ground by collaborating with best selling writer Anna McPartlin on her new book So What if I'm Broken, in which each chapter was inspired by and named after one of Lukeman's songs. The narrative consisted of the relationship between Jack L fans.

Lukeman was awarded the Edinburgh Spotlight Best Music Award at the World biggest and oldest festival, the Edinburgh Fringe Festival 2010 for his show "A Month of Mondays".

In May 2011 Lukeman joined forces with fellow Irish singer Julie Feeney to present a series of radio shows on Lyric FM called "High Fidelity" tracing the history of recorded song from Edison to the IPOD.

In 2013 Lukeman Released the Great Wall of China EP, a song cycle and travelogue with songs such as The Ghosts of Malta and Nick Drake. Kicking off The Great Wall of China Tour saw him support Jools Holland's UK tour.

In 2016 Lukeman performed at RTÉ's Centenary Concert to mark the 100 year anniversary of Ireland's 1916 Rising.

During his musical career Lukeman has worked with Golden Globe nominated composer Brian Byrne, the Nelson Riddle Orchestra, the Brooklyn Philharmonic and producers Greg Wells, Craig Armstrong and Martin Clancy.

Lukeman has also performed over the years supporting or alongside U2, Ronnie Wood, Robert Plant and Jimmy Page, John Lee Hooker, Elvis Costello, Jools Holland, and Marianne Faithfull, and has appeared at venues such as Olympia Paris, Royal Albert Hall in London, and The Lincoln Center in NYC.

Discography

Albums
Wax (1995, with The Black Romantics)
Acoustico (1997, limited release)
Metropolis Blue (1999)
Universe (2001)
Songs from the Little Universe Show (2002)
The Amsterdam Album (2005)
Broken Songs (2006)
Burn On (2008)
The Story So Far – The Essential Collection (2009)
The 27 Club (2012)
The Great Wall of China EP (2013)
Northern Lights – Songs for the Winter Solstice (2014)
The King of Soho (2016)
Magic Days (2017)
Streamed: Best of the Lockdown Sessions Vol. 1 (2020)
Echo On (2022) – No. 22 Ireland

References

External links
 
 Jack Lukeman on Facebook
 Jack Lukeman on Twitter
 Jack Lukeman on Reverbnation
 Jack Lukeman on SoundCloud
 Jack Lukeman Onesheet
 Jack Lukeman on Last.FM

1973 births
Living people
21st-century Irish  male singers